Nizam Uddin Ahmed was a Awami League politician and the former Member of Parliament of Patuakhali-5 and Barguna-3.

Early life and career
Ahmed was born to Ismail Talukder (Badsha Mia), who was also a former MPA. He was elected to parliament from Patuakhali-5 as an Awami League candidate in 1973. He was later elected to parliament from Barguna-3 as a Awami League candidate in 1986. He was the President of the Barguna District unit of the Awami League.

Death 
Ahmed died in a road accident on 9 December 1990 ,in front of Ithe nstitution of Engineers, Bangladesh.

References

Awami League politicians
1948 births
1990 deaths
1st Jatiya Sangsad members
3rd Jatiya Sangsad members
People from Barguna district